Ali He'shun Forney (April 12, 1975 – December 5, 1997) was an African-American gay and gender non-conforming transgender youth who also used the name Luscious.

Forney was a peer counselor of and advocate for homeless lesbian, gay, bisexual, and transgender (LGBT) youth and was killed on the street in the Harlem neighborhood of Manhattan in New York City. The Ali Forney Center for homeless LGBT youth was named after Forney when it opened in New York City in June 2002.

Life
Forney was born in Charlotte, North Carolina, and raised in Brooklyn, by a single mother. Forney said that they first engaged in sex work at 13, and that the $40 made them feel rich. Rejected by their family at around that time, Forney was put in a group home, from which they soon ran away. Forney was in a series of foster placements, but found the streets preferable. Forney, assigned male at birth, continued to work as a sex worker, often dressed in women's clothing. Forney admitted to using crack cocaine "because it eased the degradation and fear" from sex work.

At 17, Forney joined the Safe Horizon Streetwork program, where counselors helped them acquire a Social Security card and a medical card. Forney completed a GED and, at the time of their death, had started to work with the staff to help other homeless youth. After turning 18, Forney received a settlement for a childhood car accident, but remained estranged from their family, and was ineligible for city youth shelters after reaching the age of 19.

Proudly HIV-negative, Forney became good at peer counseling and promoted safety, carrying a pocketful of condoms and offering them to drug dealers. Forney said, "I became a peer educator because I see so many HIV-infected people on the stroll. Even now, there are people who don't know how to use condoms." In 1996, Forney was invited to San Francisco, California, to tell social workers about the needs of homeless transgender youth.

At 4 a.m. on December 5, 1997, Forney was found by the police shot to death on the sidewalk in front of a housing project on East 131st Street in Harlem. According to The New York Times Forney was the third young transgender sex worker murdered in Harlem in fourteen months. Forney's murder has never been solved.

Over seventy people attended Forney's memorial service.

Ali Forney Center

When Carl Siciliano started a center for homeless LGBT youth in New York in 2002, he named it the Ali Forney Center (also known as AFC) in Forney's memory. The center opened in June 2002. It serves mostly Manhattan and Brooklyn youth aged 16 to 24 years, providing them with safe shelter and other help in addition to counseling for their families where needed.

See also

 Homelessness among LGBT youth in the United States
 List of people from Brooklyn
 List of unsolved murders

References

1975 births
1997 deaths
1997 murders in the United States
20th-century American people
American prostitutes
Deaths by firearm in Manhattan
Homeless people
LGBT African Americans
LGBT and homelessness
LGBT people from New York (state)
LGBT people from North Carolina
Female murder victims
Murdered African-American people
Sex workers murdered in the United States
People from Brooklyn
People from Charlotte, North Carolina
People murdered in New York City
Transgender women
Unsolved murders in the United States
Violence against women in the United States
Violence against trans women
20th-century African-American people
20th-century American LGBT people
African-American history of New York (state)